Mohd Suhaimi bin Husin (born 9 August 1994) is a Malaysian footballer who plays for Terengganu in Malaysia Super League as a goalkeeper.

References

External links 
 

1994 births
Living people
Malaysian footballers
Association football defenders
Terengganu F.C. II players